Carl Winterhoff was an American actor. He appeared in 18 films between 1909 and 1913.

Selected filmography

The Cowboy Millionaire (1909)
A Man Among Men (1912) - Steve Wilson
Prompted by Jealousy (1913) - Ralph Wilson
Don't Let Mother Know (1913) - Tom Moran
The Pink Opera Cloak (1913) - John Foragan
Tommy's Atonement (1913) - Mr. Hale

External links

Year of birth missing
Year of death missing
American male film actors
American male silent film actors
20th-century American male actors